The International Panel of ICC Development Umpires is a panel of international cricket umpires chosen by the International Cricket Council (ICC). Established in 2005, its members are drawn primarily (though not exclusively) from the organisation's associate members (rather than its full members). It stands alongside, and is intended to offer a career path into the Elite Panel of ICC Umpires. Umpires on the panel are not restricted to matches between associate teams, and have officiated at One Day International (ODI) and Twenty20 International level.

This panel also includes 12 woman officials. They are Lauren Agenbag, Kim Cotton, Shivani Mishra, Claire Polosak, Sue Redfern, Eloise Sheridan, Mary Waldron, Jacqueline Williams, Narayanan Janani and Vrinda Rathi.

Current panel
The panel was updated on 23 March 2020, and has a current membership of 53.

See also
 Elite Panel of ICC Umpires

References

Cricket umpiring
Cricket umpiring associations
International Cricket Council
Sports organizations established in 2005